Jewish Women's Collaborative International Fund (JWCIF) is a non-profit organization that promotes women's rights and gender equality. Its member organizations include Jewish Women's organizations in the United States and Israel.

Feminist Partnership
An unprecedented program entitled "Bringing Women to the Fore: The Feminist Partnership" is coordinated through the Jewish Women's Collaborative International Fund and to "lead effective change in social perception and public policy, to promote equality and reduce gender gaps in the economic, social and occupational spheres – making Israel a more gender-equal society." Organizations to affect change include Adva Center, Women's Spirit, Itach-Maaki: Women Lawyers for Social Justice, Mahut Center, The Israel Women's Network (IWN), Economic Empowerment for Women (EEW), and Achoti (Sister) for Women in Israel.

Member organizations
Fourteen member organizations in the United States and three member organizations in Israel include:
 Boston Jewish Community Women's Fund
 Israel Lions of Judah
 Jewish Women's Foundation of Broward County
 Jewish Women's Foundation of Greater Pittsburgh
 Jewish Women's Foundation of Metropolitan Chicago
 Jewish Women's Foundation of Metropolitan Detroit
 Jewish Women's Foundation of New York
 Jewish Women's Foundation of South Palm Beach County
 Jewish Women's Foundation of the Greater Palm Beaches
 National Council of Jewish Women Israel Granting Program
 The Dafna Fund
 The Hadassah Foundation
 The Netivot and Neshamot Funds of UJA-Federation/Westchester Women's Venture Fund
 Tikkun Olam Women's Foundation of Greater Washington
 Women of Vision – The Jewish Women's Foundation of Greater Philadelphia
 Women's Amutot Initiative of the Greater Miami Jewish Federation

References

Further reading
 Christine Sierocki Lupella. "Women Helping Women." JUF News. June 28, 2012.

Jewish women's organizations
Feminist organizations in Israel
Feminist organizations in the United States
Jewish feminism